The Jakarta Transactions (JTA; formerly Java Transaction API), one of the Jakarta EE APIs, enables distributed transactions to be done across multiple X/Open XA resources in a Java environment. JTA was a specification developed under the Java Community Process as JSR 907. JTA provides for:

demarcation of transaction boundaries
X/Open XA API allowing resources to participate in transactions.

X/Open XA architecture

In the X/Open XA architecture, a transaction manager or transaction processing monitor (TP monitor) coordinates the transactions across multiple resources such as databases and message queues. Each resource has its own resource manager. The resource manager typically has its own API for manipulating the resource, for example the JDBC API to work with relational databases. In addition, the resource manager allows a TP monitor to coordinate a distributed transaction between its own and other resource managers. Finally, there is the application which communicates with the TP monitor to begin, commit or roll back the transactions. The application also communicates with the individual resources using their own API to modify the resource.

JTA implementation of the X/Open XA architecture
The JTA API consists of classes in two Java packages:
 
 

The JTA is modelled on the X/Open XA architecture, but it defines two different APIs for demarcating transaction boundaries. It distinguishes between an application server such as an EJB server and an application component. It provides an interface, that is used by the application server itself to begin, commit and roll back the transactions.

The JTA architecture requires that each resource manager must implement the  interface in order to be managed by the TP monitor. As stated previously, each resource will have its own specific API, for instance:
 relational databases use JDBC
 messaging services use JMS
 generalized EIS (Enterprise Information System) resources  use Java EE Connector API.

Application Programming Interface
The Jakarta Transactions API consists of three elements: a high-level application transaction demarcation interface, a high-level transaction manager interface intended for an application server, and a standard Java mapping of the X/Open XA protocol intended for a transactional resource manager.

UserTransaction interface
The  interface provides the application the
ability to control transaction boundaries programmatically. This interface may be used
by Java client programs or EJB beans.

The  method starts a global transaction and associates the
transaction with the calling thread. The transaction-to-thread association is managed
transparently by the Transaction Manager.

Support for nested transactions is not required. The UserTransaction.begin method
throws the NotSupportedException when the calling thread is already associated
with a transaction and the transaction manager implementation does not support nested
transactions.

Transaction context propagation between application programs is provided by the
underlying transaction manager implementations on the client and server machines.
The transaction context format used for propagation is protocol dependent and must be
negotiated between the client and server hosts. For example, if the transaction manager
is an implementation of the JTS specification, it will use the transaction context
propagation format as specified in the CORBA OTS 1.1 specification. Transaction
propagation is transparent to application programs.

@Transactional annotation
The  annotation provides the application the
ability to control transaction boundaries declaratively. This annotation can be applied to any class that the Jakarta EE specification
defines as a managed bean (which includes CDI managed beans).

The code sample below illustrates the usage of @Transactional in a request scoped CDI managed bean:

@RequestScoped
public class ExampleBean {

    @Transactional
    public void foo() { // A transaction is active here
        
        // Do work

    } // After the method returns transaction is committed or rolled back
}

Transactional behavior can be configured via an attribute on the annotation. The available options closely mirror those of the EJB specification.

@TransactionScoped annotation
The  annotation provides the application the
ability to declare that the scope during which a bean lives is tied to the time a given transaction is active.

The code sample below illustrates the usage of @TransactionScoped in a request scoped CDI managed bean:

@TransactionScoped
public class TxScopedBean {
    public int number;

    public int getNumber() {return number;}
    public void setNumber(int number) {this.number = number;}
}

@RequestScoped
public class ExampleBean {

    @Inject
    private TxScopedBean txScopedBean;

    @Transactional
    public void foo() {
        txScopedBean.setNumber(1);
    }

    @Transactional
    public void bar() {
        System.out.print(tXscopedBean.getNumber());
    }
}

If method foo() is first called on a managed instance of ExampleBean and then subsequently method bar() is called, the number printed will be 0 and not 1. This is because each method had its own transaction and therefore its own instance of TxScopedBean. The number 1 that was set during the call to foo() will therefore not be seen during the call to bar().

UserTransaction support in EJB server
EJB servers are required to support the UserTransaction interface for use by EJB
beans with the BEAN value in the   annotation (this is called bean-managed transactions or BMT). The UserTransaction
interface is exposed to EJB components through either the EJBContext interface using the
getUserTransaction method, or directly via injection using the general @Resource annotation. Thus, an EJB application does not interface with the
Transaction Manager directly for transaction demarcation; instead, the EJB bean relies
on the EJB server to provide support for all of its transaction work as defined in the
Jakarta Enterprise Beans Specification. (The underlying interaction between the EJB
Server and the TM is transparent to the application; the burden of implementing transaction management is on the EJB container and server provider.)

The code sample below illustrates the usage of UserTransaction via bean-managed transactions in an EJB session bean:

@Stateless
@TransactionManagement(BEAN)
public class ExampleBean {

    @Resource
    private UserTransaction utx;

    public void foo() {
        // start a transaction
        utx.begin();

        // Do work

        // Commit it
        utx.commit();
    }
}

Alternatively, the UserTransaction can be obtained from the SessionContext:

@Stateless
@TransactionManagement(BEAN)
public class ExampleBean {

    @Resource
    private SessionContext ctx;

    public void foo() {
        UserTransaction utx = ctx.getUserTransaction();

        // start a transaction
        utx.begin();

        // Do work

        // Commit it
        utx.commit();
    }
}

Note though that in the example above if the @TransactionManagement(BEAN) annotation is omitted, a JTA transaction is automatically started whenever foo() is called and is automatically committed or rolled back when foo() is exited. Making use of a UserTransaction is thus not necessary in EJB programming, but might be needed for very specialized code.

UserTransaction support in JNDI
The UserTransaction should be available under java:comp/UserTransaction (if a JTA implementation is installed in the environment).

See also

 Java transaction service

References

External links
 
 JSR 907
 Atomikos transaction manager website
 Narayana transaction manager website
 Bitronix transaction manager website

Transaction API
Transaction API
Java APIs
Articles with example Java code